Egira februalis, the mottled oak woodling, is a species of cutworm or dart moth in the family Noctuidae. It was first described by William Barnes and James Halliday McDunnough in 1918 and it is found in North America.

The MONA or Hodges number for Egira februalis is 10510.

References

Further reading

 
 
 

Orthosiini
Articles created by Qbugbot
Moths described in 1918